"Samurai" is a song by Romanian-German singer-songwriter Michael Cretu from his third studio album, Die Chinesische Mauer (1985).

Composition and chart performance 

In the lyrics, the protagonist of the song shows how frustrating his live act is.

A German-language version of the song was also released around the same time as the English version, but it was not a commercial success unlike the English version which reached the top 20 in a number of countries across Europe.

Music video 

The plot of the music video features Michael Cretu with some studio musicians in a dojo, while two kendōkas are fighting against each other.

Track listing and formats 

 European 7-inch single

A. "Samurai (Did You Ever Dream)" – 4:28
B. "Sword of Fear" – 3:55

 European 12-inch maxi-single

A. "Samurai (Did You Ever Dream)" (Long Version) – 7:01
B1. "Samurai (Did You Ever Dream)" – 4:28
B2. "Sword of Fear" (Instrumental) – 3:55

Charts

References 

1985 songs
1985 singles
Michael Cretu songs
Songs written by Michael Cretu
Songs written by Richard Palmer-James
Virgin Records singles